Squamous part may refer to:

 Squamous part of frontal bone
 Squamous part of temporal bone
 Squamous part of occipital bone